The sanctuary of Apollo Maleatas is located on a low hill on Mount Kynortion, east of the sanctuary of Asklepios at Epidaurus.

At the peak of the hill was a small Early Helladic settlement, which was never built on in later periods.  At the beginning of the Late Bronze Age, an open-air altar was used where animals were sacrificed and votives deposited in the ash.  Dedications include votive bronze double axes, bronze swords, and clay animal figurines.  There is evidence for cult activity in the Geometric period.

Most of the structures on the site belong to the 4th century BC or to the 2nd century AD, when there was a major building campaign paid for by Sextus Iulius Maior Antoninus Pythodorus, an aristocrat from Nysa, Anatolia and a Roman senator. Pausanias, who visited the sanctuary in the third quarter of the 2nd century, described his contributions:
"Above the sacred grove [of Asklepios at Epidauros] is another mountain called Kynortion, on which there is a sanctuary of Apollo Maleatas. The sanctuary itself is ancient, but everything about it, including the cistern in which the rain-water is collected, is a gift of Antoninus to the Epidaurians." 
The temple could not have been in functioned to a later date than the 4th or 5th century, when all pagan shrines were closed during the persecution of pagans in the late Roman Empire.

Remains on the site include Roman baths, an underground cistern, a Roman fountain, a small Doric temple of Apollo (4th century BC), an altar, a shrine of the muses, living quarters for the sanctuary staff, a Roman gateway, and a stoa (late 4th century BC).

Bibliography 
 Christopher Mee and Anthony Spawforth. 2001. Greece: An Oxford Archaeological Guide (Oxford), pp. 210–212.
 Theodorou-Mavrommatidi, Anthi. 2004. An Early Helladic Settlement in the Apollon Maleatas Site at Epidauros. Die Ägäische Frühzeit 2. Serie: Forschungsbericht 1975–2002. Alram-Stern, Eva, ed. . Wien, Verlag der Österreichischen Akademie der Wissenschaften. 2.2 Die Frühbronzezeit in Griechenland, mit Ausnahme von Kreta. Veröffentlichungen der Mykenischen Kommission 21, pp. 1167–1188.
 Lambrinoudakis, V.K. 1981. Remains of the Mycenaean Period in the Sanctuary of Apollo Maleatas. Hägg, R., and N. Marinatos, Sanctuaries and Cults in the Aegean Bronze Age. Proceedings of the First International Symposium at the Swedish Institute in Athens, 12–13 May 1980. SkrAth, 4°, XXVII. Svenska Institutet i Athen, Stockholm, pp. 59–65.

References

Temples of Apollo
4th-century BC religious buildings and structures